The 2012–2013 figure skating season begins in July 2012 and ends in June 2013. Figure skaters use music in competition.

Men

Ladies

Pairs

Ice dancing

References 

Music
Music
Figure skating-related lists